AAAS may refer to:

 American Academy of Arts and Sciences, a learned society and center for policy research; the publisher of the journal Dædalus
 American Association for the Advancement of Science, an organization that supports scientific collaboration, education, and outreach; the publisher of the journal Science
 Association for Asian American Studies, an organization that promotes teaching and research in Asian American studies
 Associate of the American Antiquarian Society
 AAAS (gene), a human gene responsible for triple-A syndrome (achalasia, adrenocortical insufficiency, alacrimia)